Paul Krauß (18 October 1917 – 20 February 1942) was a German ski jumper.

Career 
In 1941 on Bloudkova velikanka in Planica at Smuški poleti Week event, he set only a personal best with 112 metres (367 ft) and not world record as it was misconception for many years.

He took 43rd place on normal hill at 1936 Winter Olympics in Garmisch-Partenkirchen. Krauß died as a soldier on the Eastern Front (World War II).

Winter Olympics

References

External links
Sports Reference: Paul Krauß

1917 births
1942 deaths
People from Johanngeorgenstadt
People from the Kingdom of Saxony
German male ski jumpers
Sportspeople from Saxony
German military personnel killed in World War II
Olympic ski jumpers of Germany
Ski jumpers at the 1936 Winter Olympics
20th-century German people